The Roman Catholic Archdiocese of Samoa–Apia (Samoan: Puleaga Fa'aAkiepikopo Samoa–Apia) consists of the Independent State of Samoa.

History
In 1842, the Propaganda Fide created the Apostolic Vicariate of Central Oceania that included New Caledonia, Tonga, Samoa and Fiji Islands. This lost territory with establishment by canonical erection by the Holy See on August 20, 1850, of the Vicariate Apostolic of the Navigators' Archipelago, entrusted to the Society of Mary (Marists). On January 4, 1957, the Vatican changed the name of the Vicariate Apostolic to Samoa and the Tokelau Islands.

The vicariate apostolic was elevated to the Diocese of Apia on June 21, 1966, and made suffragan to the metropolitan see of Suva, Fiji. On August 10, 1974, the name of the diocese was changed to Diocese of Apia o Samoa and Tokelau; and it was changed again on December 3, 1975, to the Diocese of Samoa and Tokelau.

On September 10, 1982, the diocese was elevated to the dignity of an archdiocese taking the name of the See city, Apia.  Simultaneously, the Diocese of Samoa–Pago Pago was created from a portion of the former Diocese of Samoa Tokelau and made suffragan to the metropolitan see of Apia.

Ordinaries

Guillaume Marie Douarre S.M. (1850-1853)
Pierre Bataillon, S.M.(1853–1870)
Aloys Elloy, S.M. (1870–1878)
Jean-Armand Lamaze, S.M. (1879–1896)
 S. M. (1896–1918)
Joseph Darnand S. M. (1919–1953)
 S. M. (1953–1955)
George Hamilton Pearce S. M. (1956–1967), appointed Archbishop of Suva, Fiji, Pacific (Oceania)
Pio Taofinu'u S. M. (1968–2002), elevated to Cardinal in 1973
Alapati Lui Mataeliga (2002– )

Ecclesiastical province
See: Ecclesiastical Province of Samoa–Apia.
As the metropolitan see, the archdiocese has two suffragans: the Diocese of Samoa–Pago Pago and the Mission Sui Iuris of Tokelau. Until March 2003, the Mission Sui Iuris of Funafuti was also a suffragan, but since that date it is now a suffragan of the Archdiocese of Suva.

See also

 Catholic Church by country
 Catholic Church in the United States
 Ecclesiastical Province of Samoa-Apia
 Global organisation of the Catholic Church
 List of Roman Catholic archdioceses (by country and continent)
 List of Roman Catholic dioceses (alphabetical) (including archdioceses)
 List of Roman Catholic dioceses (structured view) (including archdioceses)
 List of the Catholic dioceses of the United States

References

Further reading
 Galuega O Le Sinoti (Acts of the Snyod [of the Archdiocese of Samoa-Apia]), December 7–14, 1990, promulgated, May 1, 1991, Feast of Saint Joseph the Worker. Apia, Samoa.

External links
 Roman Catholic Archdiocese of Samoa-Apia Official Site

Religious organizations established in 1850
Samoa-Apia
Samoa-Apia
Roman Catholic dioceses in Samoa
1850s establishments in Samoa